Silence Wang (born 17 September 1989) is a Chinese pop singer and songwriter. He made his debut with the album Slowly Understand on 19 November 2010, and now he has published 10 albums. His songs range from hip hop and rap to contemporary pop.

Early life 
Silence Wang was born on 17 September 1989, into an art family in Shenyang, Liaoning. He is an ethnic Manchu. Silence Wang had a strong interest in music since his childhood. He began to learn classical music in junior high school and was admitted to the Middle School of Shenyang Conservatory of Music in high school. He graduated from the Undergraduate Music Department of Shenyang Conservatory of Music.

During his time in University, he released his own works on music streaming websites and topped multiple music charts. He was then signed by his record label and started his career as a professional singer-songwriter.

Career 
On 14 May 2010, Wang's first album, First was released. On 19 November, his first personal EP, Slowly Understand, was published in collaboration with the Shenyang Conservatory of Music.

In March 2012, Wang joined record label, The Wonderful Music. In August, his second album, Gravitation was released. On 31 December 2012, he attended the CCTV New Year's Gala and sang "The time of the meeting" with Xu Liang.

On 16 April 2014, Wang left The Wonderful Music. In May, he set up record label Elephant Music with Xu Liang and released the single song "Clear". In June, he announced the establishment of his individual brand SU2. On 25 June, he released the album Legendary Movement, which features strong classical music elements.

On 16 January 2018, Wang collaborated with Zhu Yuanbing to sing "Choose Me to Choose Me", which was published online. On 1 February, he attended the Cool Dog Music live annual festival and got "the most popular example male singer". On 8 February, he participated in the Hunan Satellite TV Spring Festival Gala.

On 17 October 2019, he was named one of the 2019 Forbes China Celebrities Under 30. On 31 December 2019, he participated in the Zhejiang Satellite TV 2020 New Year's Gala.

On 18 January 2020, he participated in the Hunan Satellite TV Spring Festival Gala, where he sang with Chen Xiang and SNH48.

Discography

Albums

Singles

References

External links 
 
 
 

1989 births
Living people
Chinese Mandopop singers
Mandopop singer-songwriters
Musicians from Shenyang
Shenyang Conservatory of Music alumni
Manchu singers
21st-century Chinese male singers